Thomas Montgomery may refer to:

Thomas Montgomery (American politician) (1779–1828), U.S. Representative from Kentucky
Thomas Montgomery (Irish politician) (1700–1761), Irish politician
Thomas Harrison Montgomery (1830–1905), American businessman and historian
Thomas Harrison Montgomery Jr. (1873–1912), American zoologist
Thomas Hartley Montgomery (1842–1873), senior official of the Royal Irish Constabulary
Thomas Lynch Montgomery (1862–1929), American librarian from Pennsylvania
Thomas M. Montgomery (born 1941), American military officer
Thomas Montgomery (innkeeper) (1790–1877), Upper Canada militia officer and innkeeper (Montgomery's Inn) in modern-day Etobicoke
Thomas Montgomery (murderer), American murderer

See also
Thomas George Montgomerie (1830–1878), British surveyor